Judith Elaine Loganbill  (May 5, 1953 – December 19, 2020) was an American politician who served as a Democratic member of the Kansas House of Representatives, representing the 86th district from 2001 to 2013.

She died on December 19, 2020, in Wichita, Kansas, at age 67.

Committee membership
 Education
 Federal and State Affairs (Ranking Member)
 Government Efficiency and Fiscal Oversight
 Joint Committee on Kansas Security

Major donors
The top 5 donors to Loganbill's 2008 campaign:
1. Kansas Contractors Assoc 	$1,000 	
2. Kansans for Lifesaving Cures 	$1,000 	
3. Kansas Trial Lawyers Assoc 	$1,000 	
4. Kansas National Education Assoc 	$750 	
5. Kansas Optometric Assoc 	$750

References

External links
 Kansas Legislature - Judith Loganbill
 Project Vote Smart profile
 Kansas Votes profile
 State Surge - Legislative and voting track record
 Campaign contributions: 2000, 2002,  2006, 2008

1953 births
2020 deaths
Democratic Party members of the Kansas House of Representatives
Women state legislators in Kansas
21st-century American women politicians
21st-century American politicians
Bethel College (Kansas) alumni
Northern Arizona University alumni